The Handball Competitions at the 2007 Pan American Games took place at the Riocentro Sports Complex in a temporary facility. There are two competitions, one each for men and women, each with eight national teams competing. Brazil is the defending champion for both the men's and women's competitions.

The teams compete in a multi-stage tournament. In each competition, the teams are divided into two four-team groups. In each group, each team plays against all others once, and the two best in each group advance to the semifinals to compete in the knockout tournament. The two teams in each group that do not make the semifinals play in 5th to 8th classification matches. The winning sides of both the men’s and women’s tournament will directly qualify for the 2008 Olympic Handball Tournaments.

Medal winners

Men's competition

Preliminary round

Group A

Group B

Knockout stage

Bracket

5–8th place semifinals

Semifinals

Seventh place game

Fifth place game

Bronze medal game

Gold medal game

Ranking and statistics

Top scorers

Top goalkeepers
(minimum 20% of total shots received by team)

Women's competition

Preliminary round

Group A

Group B

Knockout stage

Bracket

5–8th place semifinals

Semifinals

Seventh place game

Fifth place game

Bronze medal game

Gold medal game

Ranking and statistics

Top scorers

Top goalkeepers
(minimum 20% of total shots received by team)

References
Men's Results
Women's Results

Pan American Games
2007
Events at the 2007 Pan American Games
Pan American Games